Days in inventory (also known as "Inventory Days of Supply", "Days Inventory Outstanding" or the "Inventory Period") is an efficiency ratio that measures the average number of days the company holds its inventory before selling it. The ratio measures the number of days funds are tied up in inventory. Inventory levels (measured at cost) are divided by sales per day (also measured at cost rather than selling price.)

The formula for days in inventory is:

where DII is days in inventory and COGS is cost of goods sold. The average inventory is the average of inventory levels at the beginning and end of an accounting period, and COGS/day is calculated by dividing the total cost of goods sold per year by the number of days in the accounting period, generally 365 days.

This is equivalent to the 'average days to sell the inventory' which is calculated as:

 

The article on inventory turnover provides a more complete discussion of issues related to the diagnosis of inventory effectiveness, although it does not provide these synonyms.

See also
 Working capital analysis
 Days sales outstanding
 Days payable outstanding
 Cash conversion cycle

Notes

Financial ratios
Working capital management